Tison may refer to:

People
 André Tison (1885 – 1963), French Olympic track and field athlete
 Annette Tison (b. 1942), French architect and writer
 James C. Tison, Jr. (1908 – 1991), American admiral and civil engineer, sixth Director of the United States Coast and Geodetic Survey and first Director of the Environmental Science Services Administration Corps
 Tison Street (b. 1943), American composer and violinist

Other
 Tison v. Arizona, a 1987 United States Supreme Court case

See also
 Tyson